Korucak is a village in Çamlıyayla district of Mersin Province, Turkey. It a situated in the Taurus Mountains,  to east of Çamlıyayla. The population of Korucak was 358 as of 2012.

References

Villages in Çamlıyayla District